Tectarius pagodus is a species of sea snail, a marine gastropod mollusk in the family Littorinidae. That family is commonly known as the winkles or periwinkles.

Description
This species is the largest member of the genus Tectarius, and (like the rest of the family Littorinidae) is an herbivor.

Distribution
This species is endemic to the Indo-Pacific. It can be found in the upper part of the intertidal zone along rocky shores, and therefore does not often get submerged.

References

Further reading
 Reid, D. G. 1989. The Comparative Morphology, Phylogeny and Evolution of the Gastropod Family, Littorinidae. Philosophical Transactions of the Royal Society B, 324: 1–110.

Littorinidae
Gastropods described in 1758
Taxa named by Carl Linnaeus